Triette Lipsey Reeves (born August 22, 1963) is an American politician and minister from Michigan.

Early life 
On August 22, 1963, Reeves was born as Triette E. Lipsey in Detroit, Michigan. In 1982, Reeves graduated from Redford High School.

Education 
Reeves earned a Bachelor of Arts degree in public administration from Michigan State University.

Career 
Reeves started her political career as a Legislative Aide to Teola P. Hunter, a member of Michigan House of Representatives for District 5. In January 1992, Teola P. Hunter resigned. On November 3, 1992, Reeves won the special election and became a Democratic member of Michigan House of Representatives for District 5.

In 1995, Reeves served the Detroit city council, until 1998.

In 1995, Reeves became a minister for the Mount Zion Church.

On November 3, 1998, Reeves won the election and became a member of Michigan House of Representatives for District 13. Reeves defeated Leodis Brown with 89.60% of the vote. On November 7, 2000, as an incumbent, Reeves won the election and continued serving District 13. Reeves defeated Ernestine Nelson with 92.32% of the vote.

On November 5, 2002, Reeves won the election and became a Democratic member of Michigan House of Representatives for District 10. Reeves defeated John T. Nazars and Alan Jacobson with 89.22% of the vote. Reeves served in the Michigan House of Representatives until 2004.

Personal life 
In 1995, Reeves married Alando Reeves. They have three children. Reeves and her family live in Detroit, Michigan.

See also 
 2002 Michigan House of Representatives election

References 

1963 births
Living people
Michigan State University alumni
Detroit City Council members
Women city councillors in Michigan
Women state legislators in Michigan
Democratic Party members of the Michigan House of Representatives
African-American women in politics
African-American state legislators in Michigan
20th-century African-American women
20th-century African-American politicians
21st-century African-American women
21st-century African-American politicians
20th-century American women politicians
20th-century American politicians
21st-century American women politicians
21st-century American politicians
African-American city council members in Michigan
Redford High School alumni